Equestrian jumping was contested at the 2017 Asian Indoor and Martial Arts Games from 21 September to 23 September 2017. The competition took place at the Equestrian Center in Ashgabat, Turkmenistan with three events, team and individual events along with the Akhal-Teke Cup, a competition for Turkmenistan's native breed of horse.

Medalists

Medal table

Results

Akhal-Teke
21 September

Individual jumping
21–23 September

Team jumping
21 September

References 
 Medalists by events

External links
 Official website
 Results book – Equestrian Jumping

2017 Asian Indoor and Martial Arts Games events
Asian Indoor and Martial Arts Games